Jurisdicción de San Zadornil is a municipality located in the province of Burgos, Castile and León, Spain. According to the 2004 census (INE), the municipality has a population of 110 inhabitants.

The Jurisdicción de San Zadornil is made up of four towns: San Zadornil (seat or capital), Arroyo de San Zadornil, San Millán de San Zadornil and Villafría de San Zadornil.

San Millán de San Zadornil is the site of one of the combats that led to the Anglo-Allied victory at the Battle of San Millan-Osma in the Peninsular War.

References 

Municipalities in the Province of Burgos